Dolphin Public School was established in 1997 in India.

References

Schools in Uttar Pradesh
Education in Gautam Buddh Nagar district
Educational institutions established in 1997
1997 establishments in Uttar Pradesh